Jalal Omidian (born March 21, 1978) is a retired Iranian footballer who played for Zob Ahan in the IPL.

Club career
Omidian has been with Zob Ahan since 2009.

Club Career Statistics
Last Update  3 June 2010 

 Assist Goals

References

1978 births
Living people
Zob Ahan Esfahan F.C. players
Paykan F.C. players
Sanat Mes Kerman F.C. players
Iranian footballers
Association football midfielders